You, Me and Marley is a BBC2 television drama directed by Richard Spence and starring Marc O'Shea, Bronagh Gallagher, Michael Liebmann, and Michael Gregory. It was first screened in the ScreenPlay series on 30 September 1992.

The film was produced by Chris Parr. The screenplay was written by Graham Reid.

Synopsis
Filmed in Hattersley and Sholver, Oldham, Greater Manchester but set in Belfast, Northern Ireland, during 'The Troubles,' You, Me & Marley centres on the lives of five Belfast friends as they go about stealing cars and joyriding much to the distaste of the rest of the community.

Cast
Marc O'Shea as Sean
Bronagh Gallagher as Frances
Michael Liebmann as Marley

Emma Moylan as Mary
Marie Jones as Sarah
Catherine Brennan as Rosaleen
Frank Grimes as Mr. Hagan
Lorcan Cranitch as Father Tom
James Greene as Father Peter
Ian McElhinney as Reggie Devine
Nigel Craig Yob {Extra}  
Clive Hudson Yob {Extra}
Andrew Kay Security Officer

See also
Lee Clegg

References

External links

Northern Irish films
1992 television films
1992 films
British drama television series
ScreenPlay
British television films
1990s English-language films